Lake Tikub (also known as Lake Ticub, Lake Ticob, Lake Tikob or Lake Ticab) is a nearly circular crater lake located in the province of Quezon, in the Philippines. The circumference of the lake is elevated and thick with foliage that steeply slopes down to the shore of the lake. The lake is located at the foot of Mount Malepunyo, and nearby is Mount Banahaw, in Brgy. Ayusan, in the town of Tiaong. Access to the lake is through Brgy. San Pedro.

Geology
Lake Tikub is a maar or a low-profile volcano created by phreatomagmatic eruption or the interaction between groundwater and magma underneath the Earth's surface.

Getting there
From Manila, take the Pan-Philippine Highway South heading to Lucena City. In Tiaong, Quezon, upon reaching the Total Gas station to your left. When you reach the steel bridge, slow down and turn right on the first small road, across the barangay hall. Drive straight through the rough road until you reach a clearing going uphill to your left. Walk uphill until you reach the lake.

References

External links
 Geographic data related to Lake Tikub at OpenStreetMap
 Literature of the Philippines - Legend of Lake Ticob

Tikub
Tikub
Tikub
Landforms of Quezon